Lance Arnold (6 May 1926 – 31 January 1990) was an Australian rules footballer who played for Melbourne in the Victorian Football League (VFL) in the 1940s and 1950s.

References

External links 

 
 
 DemonWiki profile

Melbourne Football Club players
Australian rules footballers from Victoria (Australia)
People from Mildura
1926 births
1990 deaths
Melbourne Football Club Premiership players
One-time VFL/AFL Premiership players